Penitoa Finau (born 17 December 1993) is a New Zealand rugby union player who plays for  in Super Rugby. His playing position is flanker. He was named in the Moana Pasifika squad for the 2022 Super Rugby Pacific season. He also represented  in the 2021 Bunnings NPC.

References

External links
itsrugby.co.uk profile

1993 births
New Zealand rugby union players
Living people
Rugby union flankers
Bay of Plenty rugby union players
Moana Pasifika players